The Icelandic Ministry of Industry, Energy and Tourism is one of the cabinet-level government ministries responsible for Iceland's economy. It shares that responsibility with the Ministry of Business Affairs (responsible for banking and trade) and the Ministry of Fisheries (fishing making up some 40% of Iceland's exports). Since 2009, the responsible minister is Katrín Júlíusdóttir of the Social Democratic Alliance.

External links
Official site

Industry, Energy and Tourism
Energy in Iceland
Iceland
Iceland
Iceland